Slave Island Grama Niladhari Division is a Grama Niladhari Division of the Colombo Divisional Secretariat of Colombo District of Western Province, Sri Lanka.

Slave Island railway station, Slave Island, SLAF Colombo, Old Army Headquarters, Colombo, Victoria Masonic Temple, Beira Lake, Union Place, Ceylon Electricity Board, Ceylon Chamber of Commerce and One Galle Face are located within, nearby or associated with Slave Island.

Slave Island is a surrounded by the Fort, Wekanda, Ibbanwala, Hunupitiya and Galle Face Grama Niladhari Divisions.

Demographics

Ethnicity 

The Slave Island Grama Niladhari Division has a Moor majority (52.2%), a significant Sri Lankan Tamil population (17.6%), a significant Sinhalese population (15.8%) and a significant Malay population (12.8%). In comparison, the Colombo Divisional Secretariat (which contains the Slave Island Grama Niladhari Division) has a Moor plurality (40.1%), a significant Sri Lankan Tamil population (31.1%) and a significant Sinhalese population (25.0%)

Religion 

The Slave Island Grama Niladhari Division has a Muslim majority (69.7%), a significant Buddhist population (14.4%) and a significant Hindu population (10.5%). In comparison, the Colombo Divisional Secretariat (which contains the Slave Island Grama Niladhari Division) has a Muslim plurality (41.8%), a significant Hindu population (22.7%), a significant Buddhist population (19.0%) and a significant Roman Catholic population (13.1%)

Gallery

References 

Grama Niladhari Divisions of Colombo Divisional Secretariat